Nassaria wanneri is an extinct species of sea snail, a marine gastropod mollusk in the family Nassariidae, the true whelks.

Synonyms
 Nassaria wanneri visayensis Fraussen & Poppe, 2007: synonym of Nassaria visayensis Fraussen & Poppe, 2007 (original combination)
 † Nassaria wanneri wanneri (Tesch, 1915): synonym of † Nassaria wanneri (Tesch, 1915)

Description

Distribution

References

 Tesch, P. (1915) Jungtertiäre und Quartäre Mollusken von Timor. Paläontologie von Timor, 5, 1–134, pls. 73–95.

Nassariidae
Gastropods described in 1915